Xylocopa strandi is a species of carpenter bee in the family Apidae. It is found in Central America and North America.

References

strandi
Articles created by Qbugbot
Insects described in 1924